The 1989 Virginia Slims of Indianapolis was a women's tennis tournament played on outdoor hard courts in Indianapolis, Indiana in the United States and was part of the Category 2 tier of the 1989 WTA Tour. It was the 10th edition of the tournament and ran from October 30 through November 5, 1989. First-seeded Katerina Maleeva won her second consecutive singles title at the event.

Finals

Singles
 Katerina Maleeva defeated  Raffaella Reggi 6–4, 6–4
 It was Maleeva's only title of the year and the 6th of her career.

Doubles
 Katrina Adams /  Lori McNeil defeated  Claudia Porwik /  Larisa Savchenko 6–4, 6–4

References

External links
 ITF tournament edition details
 Tournament draws

Virginia Slims of Indianapolis
Virginia Slims of Indianapolis
Virginia Slims of Indianapolis
Virginia Slims of Indianapolis
Virginia Slims of Indianapolis
Virginia Slims of Indianapolis